Contegro CMS (Content and Growth) was a commercial website content management system (WCMS). It was developed on the ASP.NET framework and Microsoft SQL Server database.

History 
Contegro is no longer available.

References

Content management systems